Dongfeng Automobile Co., Ltd.  (abb. DFAC), is a Chinese automobile company based in Xiangyang, Hubei. It is a subsidiary of Dongfeng Motor Co., Ltd. (DFL) which is a joint venture of Dongfeng Motor Group (DFG) and Nissan. DFG is majority owned by Dongfeng Motor Corporation, a Chinese state-owned enterprise.

It makes light commercial vehicles for the Chinese market. It also makes diesel engines in a 50-50 joint venture with Cummins, Inc. known as Dongfeng Cummins Engine Co. Ltd.

, DFAC is a constituent of small cap index SSE 380 Index.

History
The predecessors of Dongfeng Automobile Company, were a light commercial vehicles factory, an engine factory and a foundry of Dongfeng Motor Corporation, that were located in Xiangyang, Hubei province. Founded in Shiyan in 1969, the ultimate parent company Dongfeng Motor Corporation was headquartered in Wuhan, the provincial capital of Hubei since 2003. However, the headquarter of Dongfeng Automobile Company was remained at Xiangyang.

The first factory of Dongfeng Motor in Xiangyang was first built in 1983.

Dongfeng Automobile Company Limited (abb. DFAC) was incorporated as a subsidiary (70% shares) of Dongfeng Motor Corporation on 21 July 1999, the date of receiving the license of incorporation, or 15 July, the date of the first annual general meeting. In the same year the rest of the shares were floated on the Shanghai Stock Exchange. The company also signed a leasing agreement with Dongfeng Motor Corporation, regarding the land lease and trademarks.

In 2001, the shares held by Dongfeng Motor Corporation were transferred to an intermediate parent company Dongfeng Motor Group (known as Dongfeng Motor Co., Ltd. at that time), as part of a debt restructuring. In 2003, the shares were transferred again, to a Sino-Japanese joint venture [new] Dongfeng Motor Co., Ltd..

In 2010, it was reported that the company started to built its electric bus assembly line.

Subsidiaries
current

former
It was approved on 28 June.

Joint ventures
Dongfeng Cummins Engine Co., Ltd. (abb. DCEC), a joint venture of Cummins and Dongfeng in Xiangyang (formerly called Xiangfan), was established in 1995. It manufactured heavy duty vehicle engines.

Shareholders

DFAC was majority owned by a joint venture Dongfeng Motor Co., Ltd., making DFAC was indirectly owned by the Chinese Government (via Dongfeng Motor Corporation), the French State (via Renault), H share shareholders of Dongfeng Motor Group and other shareholders of Nissan and Renault (via Nissan).

The Chinese Government also owned an additional 2.74% shares via their sovereign wealth fund Central Huijin as the second largest shareholder of Dongfeng Automobile Company.

Products

DFAC
The light commercial vehicle products of Dongfeng Automobile Company are sold under the DFAC brand.
Dongfeng DFAC Xiaobawang V
Dongfeng DFAC Xiaobawang W (Suzuki Carry based, later rebranded as Tuyi T3)/ Xiaobawang W08/ Xiaobawang
Dongfeng DFAC Xiaobawang W15 
Dongfeng DFAC Xiaobawang W17
Dongfeng DFAC Xiaobawang W18 
Dongfeng DFAC Duolika D5/ D6/ D7/ D8 (Nissan Cabstar based)
Dongfeng DFAC Duolika D9/ D9K/ D12
Dongfeng DFAC Furuika F5/ F6/ F7
Dongfeng DFAC Furuika R5/ R6/ R7/ R8
Dongfeng DFAC Lituo T5/ T10/ T15/ T20/ T25

DFAC electric trucks (Captain)
The electric light commercial vehicle products of Dongfeng Automobile Company are Dongfeng Electric Light Trucks sold under the DFAC or Captain（凯普特） brand.
Dongfeng DFAC Captain (Kaipute) K5/ K6/ K6-N/ K7/ K8
Dongfeng EV200
Dongfeng EV300
Dongfeng EV350
Dongfeng EV400
Dongfeng EV450
Dongfeng EV500
Dongfeng E-Star

Yufeng series
The electric commercial vans of Dongfeng Automobile Company are mainly developed for the logistics industry and are mainly rebadged variants of gasoline-powered vans sold under the Yufeng series. The Dongfeng Yufeng was originally a full size van, which later spawned an electric variant called the Yufeng EM19 which became the start of the Yufeng series.

Dongfeng Yufeng EA100
Dongfeng Yufeng EM19
Dongfeng Yufeng EM26

Vasol (Dongfeng Huashen)

The light commercial vehicle products of Dongfeng Automobile Company are sold under the Dongfeng Automobile Company subsidiary, Vasol (Dongfeng Huashen)（东风华神）brand.

Dongfeng Huashen Tianlai
Dongfeng Huashen T1
Dongfeng Huashen T5
Dongfeng Huashen T7
Dongfeng Huashen F5
Dongfeng Teshang
Dongfeng Jingying

Footnotes

References

External links 
 

Truck manufacturers of China
Dongfeng Motor joint ventures
Engine manufacturers of China
Xiangyang
Companies based in Hubei
Companies listed on the Shanghai Stock Exchange